The 1936 United States Senate special election in Louisiana took place on April 21, 1936, to fill the remainder of the late former Senator Huey Long's six-year term. Long was first elected to the Senate in 1930 and was assassinated on September 10, 1935.

Governor Oscar K. Allen won the Democratic primary, but died of a brain hemorrhage a week after winning the primary. Following Allen's death, his successor as Governor, James A. Noe, appointed Long's widow, Rose McConnell Long to the Senate to fill the vacancy and the state Democratic Party named Long as its replacement nominee in the special election. Long was unopposed in the general election and won 100% of the vote, and served the final year of Long's term. She was not a candidate for re-election to a full term and was succeeded by State House Speaker Allen J. Ellender. Long was the first woman elected to the U.S. Senate from Louisiana.

Democratic primary

Candidates
 Oscar K. Allen, incumbent Governor of Louisiana
 Frank J. Looney, Shreveport attorney
 Irving Ward-Steinman, Alexandria sociologist

Results

On January 28, 1936, one week after Allen's victory in the Democratic primary, he died of a brain hemorrhage. Huey Long's widow, former First Lady Rose McConnell Long, was unanimously named by the Louisiana Democratic Party as its replacement nominee. Shortly thereafter, Governor James A. Noe appointed Long to fill the Senate vacancy.

General election

Candidates
 Rose McConnell Long, incumbent U.S. Senator, former First Lady of Louisiana

Results

See also
 1936 United States Senate elections

References

1936
Louisiana
United States Senate
Louisiana 1936
Louisiana 1936
United States Senate 1936
Single-candidate elections